Symmocoides don is a moth of the family Autostichidae. It is found in Spain and Portugal.

References

Moths described in 1963
Symmocoides